USS Telamon (ARB-8) was planned as a United States Navy  but was converted as one of twelve Aristaeus-class battle damage repair ships built for the Navy during World War II. Named for Telamon (in Greek mythology, son of the King Aeacus, who accompanied Jason as one of his Argonauts), she was the only US Naval vessel to bear the name.

Construction
Originally designated LST-956, the ship was redesignated ARB-8 and named Telamon on 28 April 1944, before the construction began. She was laid down on 5 December 1944, at Hingham, Massachusetts, by the Bethlehem-Hingham Shipyard; launched on 10 January 1945; and commissioned on 5 February 1945. After steaming to Baltimore, she was decommissioned, underwent conversion at Maryland Drydock Company, and was recommissioned on 1 June 1945.

Service history
On 14 July, the new battle damage repair ship reported for duty with the US Pacific Fleet and on 23 July, was assigned to Pearl Harbor as her home port and yard. She joined Service Squadron 10 at Guam, in September, shortly before being placed in the Pacific Fleet Reserve on 11 September 1945.

In the spring of 1946, as part of Service Group 1.8, she took part in preparations for "Operation Crossroads" at Bikini Atoll. On 21 June 1946, before the nuclear tests took place, She departed the atoll and steamed to Kwajalein. She was decommissioned on 20 May 1947, and joined the San Diego Group Reserve Fleet that same day. She remained inactive until 1 June 1973, when her name was struck from the Naval Vessel Register.

Telamon was sold for scrapping 1 March 1974, by the Defense Reutilization and Marketing Service.

Notes

Citations

Bibliography 

Online resources

External links
 

Aristaeus-class repair ships
Aristaeus-class repair ships converted from LST-542-class ships
Ships built in Hingham, Massachusetts
1945 ships
World War II auxiliary ships of the United States
Pacific Reserve Fleet, San Diego